Sundiata is the second album (but fourth released) by jazz saxophonist Chris Potter. It was recorded on December 13th, 1993 but not released by the Criss Cross Jazz label until 1995. It features Potter in a quartet with pianist Kevin Hays, bassist Doug Weiss and veteran drummer Al Foster.

Reception

The AllMusic review by David R. Adler states "Sundiata ranks as one of Potter's finest efforts ... Sundiata is an early sign of Chris Potter's importance in the jazz world".

Track listing
All compositions by Chris Potter except where noted
 "Fear of Flying" – 8:45
 "Hibiscus" – 7:39
 "Airegin" (Sonny Rollins) – 7:40
 "New Lullaby" – 6:52
 "Sundiata" – 8:16
 "Body and Soul" (Johnny Green, Frank Eyton, Edward Heyman, Robert Sour) – 8:00
 "Leap of Faith" – 9:36
 "C.P.'s Blues" – 5:42

Personnel
Chris Potter - tenor saxophone, alto saxophone, soprano saxophone
Kevin Hays − piano
Doug Weiss − bass
Al Foster - drums

References

Chris Potter (jazz saxophonist) albums
1995 albums
Criss Cross Jazz albums